Hope High School can refer to:
Hope High School (Afghanistan), school in Kabul, Afghanistan
Hope High School (Salford) or Oasis Academy MediaCityUK, an academy in Salford, Greater Manchester, England, UK
Hope High School (Arkansas), United States
Hope High School (California), a Los Angeles Unified School District school, United States
Hope High School (Missouri), part of the Fort Zumwalt School District, United States
Hope High School (North Dakota), a high school in North Dakota, United States
Hope High School (Rhode Island) in Providence, Rhode Island, United States

See also
John Hope College Prep in Chicago, Illinois, United States